The Armed Forces Act 2006 (c 52) is an Act of the Parliament of the United Kingdom.

It came into force on 31 October 2006. It replaces the three separate Service Discipline Acts (the Army Act 1955, the Air Force Act 1955 and the Naval Discipline Act 1957) as the system of military justice under which the British Armed Forces operate. The Armed Forces Act harmonizes service law between the three armed services.  One motivating factor behind the changes in the legislation combining discipline acts across the armed forces is the trend towards tri-service operations and defence organizations.

The Act also granted a symbolic pardon to soldiers controversially executed for cowardice and other offences during the World War I.

Key changes 

Key areas of change include:

 Summary Discipline: Summary hearing and the role of the Commanding Officer is retained at the heart of Service discipline and is the mechanism by which most offences are dealt.  Summary offences and powers are harmonised across the Services. There is a reduction in the number of offences and sentencing powers available to Commanding Officers of the Royal Navy and an increase in those available to British Army and Royal Air Force Commanding Officers as powers of punishment are harmonised. 
Service Prosecuting Authority:  A single Service Prosecuting Authority, staffed by lawyers from all three Services, has been created. The role of the SPA is unchanged in that it will determine whether to prosecute an accused under Service law and will conduct the prosecution case at most Courts Martial. 
 The Court Martial: Courts Martial remain the means of dealing with the most serious offences. A standing Court Martial has been introduced comprising a Judge Advocate and a minimum of 3 or 5 Service members depending on the seriousness of the offence. In order to harmonise with the other Services, the Royal Navy introduced the unqualified right for all personnel to elect for trial by Court Martial regardless of the seriousness of the offence.

Offences

The Act sets out offences against service law and the associated punishments. The offences fall into two main categories:
 discipline offences, which can only be committed by members of the armed forces or, in a few cases, by a civilian subject to service discipline
 criminal conduct offences, which are acts done anywhere in the world which, if done in England and Wales, would be against the civilian criminal law.

Pardon
The mass pardon of 306 British Empire soldiers executed for certain offences during the World War I was enacted in section 359 of the Act, which came into effect on royal assent. This number included three from New Zealand, twenty three from Canada, two from the West Indies, two from Ghana and one each from Sierra Leone, Egypt and Nigeria.

Tom Watson, then Parliamentary Under-Secretary of State at the Ministry of Defence, was instrumental in including this in the Act. He was said to have acted having met the relatives of Private Harry Farr, who was executed during the Great War despite strong evidence that he was suffering from PTSD.

However section 359(4) states that the pardon "does not affect any conviction or sentence." Since the nature of a pardon is normally to commute a sentence, Gerald Howarth MP asked during parliamentary debate: "we are entitled to ask what it does do." It would appear to be a symbolic pardon only, and some members of Parliament had called for the convictions to be quashed, although the pardon has still been welcomed by relatives of executed soldiers.

Commencements
The following orders have been made under section 383(2):
The Armed Forces Act 2006 (Commencement No. 1) Order 2007 (S.I. 2007/1442 (C. 60))
The Armed Forces Act 2006 (Commencement No. 2) Order 2007 (S.I. 2007/2913 (C. 115))
The Armed Forces Act 2006 (Commencement No. 3) Order 2008 (S.I. 2008/1650 (C. 72))
The Armed Forces Act 2006 (Commencement No. 4) Order 2009 (S.I. 2009/812 (C. 54))
The Armed Forces Act 2006 (Commencement No. 5) Order 2009 (S.I. 2009/167 (C. 64))

See also
 Armed Forces Act
 Military courts of the United Kingdom
 Pardon for Soldiers of the Great War Act 2000

References
Halsbury's Statutes,

External links
The Armed Forces Act 2006, as amended from the National Archives.
The Armed Forces Act 2006, as originally enacted from the National Archives.
Explanatory notes to the Armed Forces Act 2006.
Hansard

United Kingdom Acts of Parliament 2006
2006 in military history
United Kingdom military law
British Armed Forces
Military justice
Courts-martial in the United Kingdom